Gorogobius nigricinctus is a species of marine fish from the family Gobiidae, the true gobies. It occurs in the Atlantic Ocean along the African coast from Senegal to Ghana and in the Gulf of Guinea, from  depth. They are harmless to humans.

Description
The fish grows to maximum 4 cm length.

References 

nigricinctus
Fish described in 1951
Fish of the Atlantic Ocean
Fish of West Africa
Fauna of Annobón
Fauna of São Tomé and Príncipe